The indigo flowerpiercer (Diglossa indigotica) is a species of bird in the family Thraupidae. It is found in humid forest on the lower west Andean slopes in northern Ecuador and Colombia.

References

 Mauck, & Burns (2009). Phylogeny, biogeography, and recurrent evolution of divergent bill types in the nectar-stealing flowerpiercers (Thraupini: Diglossa and Diglossopis). Biological Journal of the Linnean Society 98 (1): 14–28.

indigo flowerpiercer
Birds of the Colombian Andes
Birds of the Ecuadorian Andes
indigo flowerpiercer
indigo flowerpiercer
Taxonomy articles created by Polbot